Welcome Home is an album by jazz organist Richard "Groove" Holmes which was recorded in 1968 and released on the World Pacific label.

Track listing 
 "Groovin' Time" (Richard "Groove" Holmes) - 7:20   
 "Oklahoma Toad" (Dave Frishberg) - 2:11   
 "Upward Bound"  (Joe Sample) - 4:56   
 "The Madison Time"  (Eddie Morrison, Ray Bryant) - 5:35   
 "The Odd Couple" (Neal Hefti, Sammy Cahn) - 2:45   
 "I'm in the Mood for Love" (Dorothy Fields, Jimmy McHugh) - 2:46   
 "98.6 - Lazy Day" (George Fischoff, Tony Powers) - 2:26   
 "Sunday Mornin'" (Margo Guryan) - 2:27

Personnel 
Richard "Groove" Holmes - organ
Chuck Findley - trumpet
Anthony Ortega, Tom Scott - alto saxophone
Teddy Edwards - tenor saxophone
Wilton Felder - baritone saxophone, electric bass
Joe Sample - piano
George Freeman, Michael Anthony - guitar
Paul Humphrey - drums

References 

Richard Holmes (organist) albums
1968 albums
Pacific Jazz Records albums